Vicia ervilia, commonly known as ervil or bitter vetch, is an ancient grain legume crop of the Mediterranean region.
The nutritional value of the grain for ruminant cattle has guaranteed the species' continued cultivation in Morocco, Spain and Turkey. The crop is easy to cultivate and harvest and can be grown on very shallow, alkaline soils.

The grain when split resembles red lentils. For human consumption the bitterness of the seeds needs to be removed through leaching by several changes of boiling water. Owing to this bitterness, it is unlikely that someone would accidentally confuse bitter vetch with red lentils. According to Zohary and Hopf, only humans of the poorest economic classes consume this crop, or in times of famine;. Pliny the Elder states that bitter vetch (ervum) has medicinal value like vetch (vicia), citing the letters of Augustus where the emperor wrote that he regained his health from a diet of bitter vetch (N.H. 18.38).

The grain is an excellent sheep and cattle feed concentrate. It has been held in high esteem by farmers in the Old World since the beginning of agriculture to improve the nutritional value of bulk feeds.

The wild strains of bitter vetch are limited to an area that includes Anatolia and northern Iraq, with an extension south along the Anti-Lebanon Mountains of Syria and Lebanon. Traces of the earliest domesticated instances were recovered from several archeological sites in Turkey, with an uncorrected radiocarbon dating of the 7th and 6th millennia BC.

References 

ervilia
Founder crops